Washington most commonly refers to:

 Washington (state), United States
 Washington, D.C., the capital of the United States
 A metonym for the federal government of the United States
 Washington metropolitan area, the metropolitan area centered on Washington, D.C.
 George Washington (1732–1799), the first president of the United States

Washington may also refer to:

Places

England
 Washington, Tyne and Wear, a town in the City of Sunderland metropolitan borough
 Washington Old Hall, ancestral home of the family of George Washington
 Washington, West Sussex, a village and civil parish

Greenland
 Cape Washington, Greenland
 Washington Land

Philippines
New Washington, Aklan, a municipality
Washington, a barangay in Catarman, Northern Samar
Washington, a barangay in Escalante, Negros Occidental
Washington, a barangay in San Jacinto, Masbate
Washington, a barangay in Surigao City

United States
 Washington, Wisconsin (disambiguation)
 Fort Washington (disambiguation)
 Lake Washington (disambiguation)
 Mount Washington (disambiguation)
 Port Washington (disambiguation)
 Washington Avenue (disambiguation)
 Washington Boulevard (disambiguation)
 Washington Bridge (disambiguation)
 Washington County (disambiguation)
 Washington district (disambiguation)
 Washington Island (disambiguation)
 Washington Park (disambiguation)
 Washington Square (disambiguation)
 Washington Street (disambiguation)
 Washington Township (disambiguation)
 Washington Valley (disambiguation)

Cities and communities
 Washington, Alabama
 Washington, Arkansas
 Washington, California, in Nevada County
 Washington, Yolo County, California
 Washington, Connecticut
 Washington, Georgia
 Washington, Illinois
 Washington, Indiana
 Washington, Iowa
 Washington, Kansas
 Washington, Kentucky
 Washington, Louisiana
 Washington, Maine
 Washington, Massachusetts
 Washington, Michigan, an unincorporated community in Washington Township
 Washington, Mississippi
 Washington, Missouri
 Washington, Nebraska
 Washington, New Hampshire
 Washington, New Jersey
 Washington, New York
 Washington, North Carolina
 Washington, Oklahoma
 Washington, Pennsylvania
 Fort Washington, Pennsylvania
 Washington, Rhode Island
 Washington, Utah
 Washington, Vermont
 Washington, Virginia
 Washington, West Virginia
 Washington Court House, Ohio
 Washington-on-the-Brazos, Texas
 Washington Square (Philadelphia)
 Washington Square West, Philadelphia

Elsewhere
 Washington Escarpment, Antarctica
 Washington, Ontario, Canada
 Washington Island (French Polynesia)
 Washington Island (Kiribati)
 Washington, Guyana, a community in Mahaica-Berbice, Guyana

Education

Higher education

In the United States 
 University of Washington, Seattle, Washington
 George Washington University, Washington, D.C.
 Harold Washington College, Chicago, Illinois
 University of Mary Washington, Fredericksburg, Virginia
 Washington College, merged with Jefferson College in 1865 to form Washington & Jefferson College
 Washington College (California), formerly in Irvington, Fremont, California
 Washington College, Chestertown, Maryland
 Washington College, Connecticut, the original name of Trinity College
 Washington College of Law, at American University, Washington, D.C.
 Washington Female Seminary, Washington, Pennsylvania
 Washington Medical College, a defunct institution formerly in Baltimore, Maryland
 Washington University in St. Louis, Missouri

Outside of the United States 
 Washington International University, unaccredited institution in the British Virgin Islands
 Washington University of Barbados, named as part of an international medical school scam

Secondary education
 Lake Washington High School, Kirkland, Washington
 Washington Academy (disambiguation)
 Washington College Academy, Limestone, Tennessee
 Booker T. Washington High School (disambiguation)
 George Washington High School (disambiguation)
 Washington County High School (disambiguation)
 Washington High School (disambiguation)
 Washington International School, Washington, D.C.
 Washington School (disambiguation)

People
 Washington (name), a given name or surname
 Washington (musician), the stage name of Australian musician Megan Washington
 Washington (footballer, born 1953), Brazilian football forward Washington Luiz de Paula
 Washington (footballer, born 1 April 1975), Brazilian football manager and former striker Washington Stecanela Cerqueira
 Washington (footballer, born 10 April 1975), Brazilian football striker Washington Luiz Pereira dos Santos
 Washington (footballer, born August 1978), Brazilian football forward Washington Luiz Mascarenhas Silva
 Washington (footballer, born November 1978), Brazilian football forward Washington Luigi Garcia
 Washington (footballer, born 1985), Brazilian football striker Washington Roberto Mariano da Silva
 Washington (footballer, born May 1986), Brazilian football striker Washington de Mesquista Ferreira
 Washington (footballer, born November 1986), Brazilian football midfielder Cezar Washington Alves Portela
 Washington (footballer, born 1989), Brazilian football midfielder Washington Santana da Silva

Ships
 SS Washington (1930), an ocean liner
 SS Washington (1941), a cargo ship
 USS Washington, several U.S. Navy ships
 Washington (steamboat 1851)

Sports

In the Washington D.C. metropolitan area
 Washington Capitals, professional ice hockey team of the National Hockey League
 Washington Nationals, professional baseball team of Major League Baseball
 Washington Mystics, professional basketball team of the Women's National Basketball Association
 Washington Commanders, formerly Washington Redskins, professional American football team of the National Football League
 Washington Wizards, professional basketball team of the National Basketball Association

In Washington (state)

Division I 
 Eastern Washington Eagles, athletic teams of Eastern Washington University in Cheney, Washington 
 Washington Huskies, athletic teams of the University of Washington in Seattle, Washington
 Washington State Cougars, athletic teams of Washington State University in Pullman, Washington

Division II 

 Central Washington Wildcats, athletic teams of Central Washington University in Ellensburg, Washington
 Western Washington Vikings, athletic teams of Western Washington University in Bellingham, Washington

Elsewhere
 Washington F.C., a football club based in Washington, Tyne and Wear, England
 Washington University Bears, athletic teams of Washington University in St. Louis, Missouri, USA

Other uses
 Washington station (disambiguation)
 Washington (tree), a giant sequoia in Sequoia National Park, California, US
 Boeing Washington, British designation for the Boeing B-29 Superfortress

See also
 Washingtonian (disambiguation)